Wadi El Haour    is a town in Akkar Governorate, Lebanon.

The population  is mostly Sunni Muslim.

History
In 1838, Eli Smith noted  the village as Wady el-Hawar,  located east of esh-Sheikh Mohammed. The  inhabitants were  Greek Orthodox.

References

Bibliography

External links
 Wadi El Haour, Localiban 

Populated places in Akkar District
Eastern Orthodox Christian communities in Lebanon
Sunni Muslim communities in Lebanon